Kristian Paul Stanfill (born April 9, 1983) is an American Christian music singer, songwriter and worship leader from Atlanta, Georgia. His 2011 album Mountains Move reached No. 64 on the Billboard 200. He is currently the worship pastor at Passion City Church and a worship leader at Passion Conferences.

Early life
Stanfill was born in Marietta, Georgia, on April 9, 1983. After showing an interest in songwriting, Stanfill began playing guitar at the age of 13. At age 15, he began to lead worship in his Sunday school at Johnson Ferry Baptist Church. In 2002, after graduating from George Walton Comprehensive High School, Stanfill attended Samford University. Shortly after graduating from Samford, he started leading worship at North Point Community Church in Alpharetta, Georgia. While in college, Stanfill met his wife, Kerri. They were married in 2004, and have four children.

Musical career
In 2005, Stanfill became involved with Passion City Church and the Passion organization, leading worship. On July 10, 2007, he independently released his debut EP, Hello, which features five songs.
In 2008, Stanfill became the first artist in eight years to be signed to sixstepsrecords. In October 2008 and November 2008, he began working on his first studio album, Attention. It was completed by December 2008, and was released on April 21, 2009. His second album, Mountains Move, was released on January 7, 2011. It became his first album to appear on the Billboard 200 chart, and peaked at No. 64. The success of the album led him to be nominated for Best New Artist at the 42nd GMA Dove Awards. He released his fourth album, Make It Out Alive, on November 11, 2022, which referenced personal mental health struggles he had been dealing with over the course of the last two years.

Personal life
On November 9, 2022, Stanfill revealed on an Instagram post that he was 730 days sober. Though he was previously private about his addiction on social media, he had been transparent with his wife, friends, pastors and counselors, all of whom were supportive of his recovery.

Discography
 Hello EP (independently released, 2007)
 Attention (sixstepsrecords, 2009)
 Mountains Move (sixstepsrecords, 2011)
 Make It Out Alive (sixstepsrecords/Sparrow Records), 2022)

Chart history

Albums

Singles

As a solo artist

Source:

As a featured artist
  style="text-align:left" |"Passion 2020"

Accolades

GMA Dove Awards

 *Denotes a collaborative effort or a song contribution to a "Various artists" album.

References

External links
 

1983 births
Living people
American performers of Christian music
Singers from Georgia (U.S. state)
Sixstepsrecords artists
21st-century American singers
21st-century American male singers